Mary Rice Hopkins is an American children's religious artist born September 6, 1956, who has written hundreds of songs for children and adults. She currently lives in Southern California.

It was Also Broadcast on the Australian Christian Channel in Australia.

Hopkins has been in the music ministry for over 30 years and has over twenty albums. She was influenced musically by her parents and brothers. Her brothers originated the country-gospel band Brush Arbor, which won the Academy of Country Music award for Vocal Group of the Year in 1974.  With Wendy Hofheimer, she recorded three albums as "Wendy & Mary" for Sparrow Records.

Hopkins has also written several children's books, as well as curriculum books that accompany her albums. Her distributor is Big Steps 4 U. According to her web site, she uses her music and ministry to share God's love and spread the good news of the gospel of Jesus Christ. In 1997, she received a lifetime achievement award from Point Loma Nazarene University, where she studied communications and Christian education.

In 2005, Hopkins teamed up with puppeteer Darcie Maze. Together they travel the country doing concerts. They also have a television show on the TBN network and the Smile of a Child network entitled, Mary Rice Hopkins and Puppets with a Heart.  The episodes incorporate the use of puppetry, music, and Scripture to speak to children about relevant life issues. A DVD that contains two of the show's episodes has received the Dove Foundation Seal of Approval and the show itself received a Parent's Television Council Seal of Approval.

Album list
 Dancing in the Desert (2010)
 Get On Board (2007)
 A Very Mary Christmas (2006)
 Sing through the Year (2004)
 ABC's of Praise (unknown year)
 Canciones Para Toda La Familia (2004)
 Sleep Little One (2009)
 Come On Home - Parables Jesus Told (2002)
 Wendy and Mary Collection (unknown year)
 Workmanship (2000)
 Miracle Mud (2000)
 Kids Kamp (1999)
 Juggling Mom (1999)
 In the Beginning - Songs from the book of Genesis (1999)
 Whispering Wind (1997)
 In My Garden (1995)
 If I Knew How to Moo (1995)
 Mary Christmas (1993)
 Lighthouse (1992)
 Good Buddies (1991)
 15 Singable Songs (1991)
 Come Meet Jesus (1990)

References

External links
 

Living people
Songwriters from California
Musicians from California
Place of birth missing (living people)
Year of birth missing (living people)
American children's musicians